Rhinella pygmaea is a species of toad in the family Bufonidae.
It is endemic to Brazil.
Its natural habitats are subtropical or tropical moist lowland forests, subtropical or tropical moist shrubland, freshwater marshes, intermittent freshwater marshes, rural gardens, urban areas, and ponds.
It is threatened by habitat loss.

References

Sources

pygmaea
Endemic fauna of Brazil
Taxonomy articles created by Polbot
Amphibians described in 1952